Gislaved may refer to:
Gislaved Municipality in Sweden
Gislaved, the seat of Gislaved Municipality
Gislaved (tires), a former Swedish tyre manufacturer
Gislaveds IS, a Swedish football club